In Our Wake is the seventh studio album by American metalcore band Atreyu. It was released on October 12, 2018 through Spinefarm. It is the final album to feature vocalist and founding member Alex Varkatzas before his departure from the band in September 2020.

Track listing

Personnel
Credits adapted from Tidal.

Atreyu
 Alex Varkatzas – lead vocals
 Dan Jacobs – lead guitar
 Travis Miguel – rhythm guitar
 Porter McKnight – bass
 Brandon Saller – drums, clean vocals

Additional personnel

 John Feldmann – production, mixing, engineering
 Dylan McLean – mixing, engineering
 Jon Lundin – mixing, engineering
 Zakk Cervini – mixing, engineering

 Ted Jensen – mastering
 Matt Malpass – engineering
 Sean Stiegemeier – photography
 Porter McKnight – art direction, design, photo editing

Charts

References

2018 albums
Atreyu (band) albums
Spinefarm Records albums